Lake Sapanca (previous Greek name: Boáne (Βοάνη)) is a fresh water lake in Turkey, between the Gulf of İzmit and the Adapazarı Meadow. The lake has a catchment area of 251 km², surface area is 45 km², a length 16 km east–west / 5 km north–south, and a maximum depth of 52 m.
Lake Sapanca, Turkey
  
Sapanca Lake is located on a tectonic hole, which is situated between Izmit Bay and Adapazari Meadow and runs parallel to Iznik Lake.

The catchment area of Lake Sapanca - about 251 km2 [km²] - is surrounded by mountains in the south and small hills in the north. Water is taken from the Lake for domestic and industrial needs.

The region around Sapanca is an important destination for day trips and weekend vacations.

List of fish in the Lake Sapanca

Anguillidae
 European eel, Anguilla anguilla (Liiaeus, 1758)

Atherinidae
 Big-scale sand smelt, Atherina boyeri (Risso, 1810)  

Clupeidae
 Black Sea shad, Alosa maeotica (Grimm, 1901)  
 Clupeonella abrau muhlisi (Neu, 1934)

Cobitidae
 Cobitis vardarensis (Karaman, 1928) 
 Angora loach, Nemacheilus angorae (Steindachner, 1897)

Cyprinidae
 Common bream, Abramis brama (Linnaeus, 1758)
 Italian bleak, Alburnus albidus (Costa, 1938)
 Common bleak, Alburnus alburnus (Linnaeus, 1758)
 Spirlin, Alburnoides bipunctatus (Bloch, 1782)
 Asp, Aspius aspius (Linnaeus, 1758)
 Silver bream, Blicca bjoerkna (Linnaeus, 1758)
 Crucian carp, Carassius carassius (Linnaeus, 1758)
 Prussian carp, Carassius gibelio (Bloch, 1782)
 Danube bleak, Chalcalburnus chalcoides (Guldenstad, 1772)
 Chondrostoma angorense (Elvira, 1987)
 Common carp, Cyprinus carpio (Linnaeus, 1758)
 Black Sea chub, Petroleuciscus borysthenicus (Kessler, 1859)
 European bitterling, Rhodeus amarus (Bloch, 1782)
 Common roach, Rutilus rutilus (Linnaeus, 1758)
 Common rudd, Scardinius erythrophthalmus (Linnaeus, 1758)
 European chub, Squalius cephalus (Linnaeus, 1758)
 Tench, Tinca tinca (Linnaeus, 1758)
 Vimba bream, Vimba vimba (Linnaeus, 1758)  

Esocidae
 Northern pike, Esox lucius (Linnaeus, 1758)

Gobiidae
 Caucasian dwarf goby, Knipowitschia caucasica (Berg, 1916)
 Racer goby, Babka gymnotrachelus (Kessler, 1857) 
 Round goby, Neogobius melanostomus (Pallas, 1814)  
 Monkey goby, Neogobius fluviatilis (Pallas, 1814)
 Syrman goby, Ponticola syrman (Nordmann, 1840) 
 Marine tubenose goby, Proterorhinus marmoratus (Pallas, 1814)  

Centrarchidae
 Pumpkinseed, Lepomis gibbosus (Linnaeus, 1758)

Percidae
 European perch, Perca fluviatilis (Linnaeus, 1758)

Petromyzontidae
 European river lamprey, Lampetra fluviatilis (Linnaeus, 1758)

Salmonidae
 Rainbow trout, Oncorhynchus mykiss (Walbaum, 1792)
 Black Sea salmon, Salmo trutta labrax (Pallas, 1811)
 Salmo cettii, Salmo trutta macrostigma (Dumeril, 1858)

Siluridae
 Wels catfish, Silurus glanis (Linnaeus, 1758)

Syngnathidae
 Black-striped pipefish, Syngnathus abaster (Risso, 1827)
 Narrow-snouted pipefish, Syngnathus tenuirostris (Rathke, 1837)
  
https://web.archive.org/web/20101105212503/http://www.fisheriessciences.com/tur/Journal/vol1/issue3/jfscom2007018.pdf

Notes 

Sapanca
Landforms of Sakarya Province
Canoeing and kayaking venues in Turkey
Important Bird Areas of Turkey